Andy Roddick defeated Mardy Fish in the final, 4–6, 7–6(7–3), 7–6(7–4) to win the singles tennis title at the 2003 Cincinnati Masters.

Carlos Moyá was the defending champion, but lost in the first round to Fabrice Santoro.

Seeds

  Andre Agassi (withdrew)
  Juan Carlos Ferrero (second round)
  Roger Federer (second round)
  Carlos Moyá (first round)
  Lleyton Hewitt (first round)
  Guillermo Coria (quarterfinals)
  Andy Roddick (champion)
  Rainer Schüttler (semifinals)
  Paradorn Srichaphan (first round)
  Sébastien Grosjean (first round)
  Sjeng Schalken (second round)
  Jiří Novák (first round)
  Fernando González (second round)
  Gustavo Kuerten (first round)
  Tommy Robredo (first round)
  Martin Verkerk (first round)
  Félix Mantilla (first round)

Draw

Finals

Top half

Section 1

Section 2

Bottom half

Section 3

Section 4

References
 2003 Western & Southern Financial Group Masters Draw

Singles